Tam Dinh (born April 10, 1990) is a Vietnamese-American professional basketball player for the Hanoi Buffaloes of the VBA and the Saigon Heat of the ASEAN Basketball League.

Pro career

Cantho Catfish (2016–2019)
In 2016, Dinh joined the Cantho Catfish of the VBA prior to the league's inaugural season. At the conclusion of the season, he was named to the All-VBA First Team, finishing with averages of 19.5 points, 5.8 rebounds, and 2.9 assists per game.

Saigon Heat (2019–present)
In 2019, Dinh signed a contract for the Saigon Heat of the ASEAN Basketball League.

International career
In 2017, Dinh received a Vietnamese passport. He made his debut for the Vietnam national team at the 2017 SEA Games in Kuala Lumpur.

Career statistics

VBA

|-
| style="text-align:left;"| 2016
| style="text-align:left;"| Cantho Catfish
| 17 || 15 || 37.4 || .500 || .340 || .670 || 5.8 || 2.9 || 1.8 || .4 || 19.5
|- class"sortbottom"
| style="text-align:left;"| 2017
| style="text-align:left;"| Cantho Catfish
| 20 || 20 || 37.32 || .420 || .280 || .630 || 6.5 || 2.7 || 1.8 || .4 || 18.3
|- class"sortbottom"
| style="text-align:left;"| 2018
| style="text-align:left;"| Cantho Catfish
| 20 || 20 || 36 || .460 || .350 || .830 || 6.3 || 2.2 || 1.7 || .1 || 17.8
|- class"sortbottom"
| style="text-align:center;" colspan="2"| Career
| 57 || 55 || 37 || .460 || .320 || .710 || 6.2 || 2.6 || 1.7 || .3 || 18.5

Awards and honors

VBA
 VBA champion: 2018
All-VBA First Team: 2016
VBA Heritage MVP: 2017
 Most Favorite Player of The Year: 2017
VBA Season MVP: 2019

References

1990 births
Living people
American expatriate basketball people in Vietnam
American men's basketball players
American sportspeople of Vietnamese descent
Competitors at the 2017 Southeast Asian Games
Competitors at the 2019 Southeast Asian Games
Saigon Heat players
Shooting guards
Small forwards
Southeast Asian Games bronze medalists for Vietnam
Southeast Asian Games medalists in basketball
Vietnamese basketball players
Competitors at the 2021 Southeast Asian Games
Southeast Asian Games medalists in 3x3 basketball
Southeast Asian Games silver medalists for Vietnam